The Last Trane is an album credited to jazz musician John Coltrane, released in 1966 on Prestige Records, catalogue 7378.

It was assembled from unissued material from three separate recording sessions at the studio of Rudy Van Gelder in Hackensack, New Jersey in 1957 and 1958. Coltrane was a sideman on all the original sessions, which were led by trumpeter Donald Byrd, pianist Red Garland or drummer Art Taylor.

Track listing
 "Lover" (Lorenz Hart, Richard Rodgers) – 7:58
 "Slowtrane" (Coltrane) – 7:19
 "By the Numbers" (Coltrane) – 12:01
 "Come Rain or Come Shine" (Harold Arlen, Johnny Mercer) – 8:43

Personnel
 John Coltrane – tenor saxophone
 Donald Byrd – trumpet (tracks 1,4)
 Red Garland – piano (tracks 1,3,4)
 Paul Chambers – bass  (tracks 1,3,4)
 Earl May – bass  (track 2)
 Louis Hayes – drums (tracks 1,4)
 Art Taylor – drums (tracks 2,3)

References

1966 albums
John Coltrane albums
Prestige Records albums
Original Jazz Classics albums
Albums produced by Bob Weinstock